Joaquim "Quim" Gutiérrez Ylla (born 27 March 1981) is a Spanish actor. He won the 2006 Goya Award for Best New Actor for his performance in Dark Blue Almost Black.

Quim was chosen by Givenchy Creative Director Riccardo Tisci to star in the brands Autumn/Winter 2013 Advertising Campaign.

Selected filmography

References

External links
 

1981 births
Living people
Male actors from Barcelona
Spanish male film actors
Spanish male television actors
20th-century Spanish male actors
21st-century Spanish male actors